Big Love is the fourth studio album by American country music artist Tracy Byrd. The album was released in 1996 on MCA Records and contains four singles: the title track, a cover of Johnny Paycheck's "(Don't Take Her) She's All I Got", "Don't Love Make a Diamond Shine", and "Good Ol' Fashioned Love". These first two singles both reached the Top 5 on the Billboard Hot Country Singles & Tracks (now Hot Country Songs) charts, and "Don't Love Make a Diamond Shine" was a Top 20; "Good Ol' Fashioned Love", however, missed the Top 40.

Track listing

Personnel
 Tracy Byrd – lead vocals
 Vinnie Ciesielski – trumpet on "I Don't Believe That's How You Feel"
 Stuart Duncan – fiddle, mandolin
 Thom Flora – background vocals
 Paul Franklin – steel guitar
 Vince Gill – background vocals
 Brent Mason – electric guitar, acoustic guitar
 Steve Patrick – trumpet on "I Don't Believe That's How You Feel"
 Michael Rhodes – bass guitar
 Matt Rollings – piano, B3 organ
 Harry Stinson – background vocals
 John Wesley Ryles – background vocals
 Biff Watson – acoustic guitar
 Billy Joe Walker, Jr. – electric guitar, acoustic guitar
 Lonnie Wilson – drums

Chart performance

1996 albums
Albums produced by Tony Brown (record producer)
Tracy Byrd albums
MCA Records albums